Stenostola argyrosticta is a species of beetle in the family Cerambycidae. It was described by Henry Walter Bates in 1884. It is found in Japan.

References

Saperdini
Beetles described in 1884